The Food Safety Act 1990  is an Act of the Parliament of the United Kingdom. It is the statutory obligation to treat food intended for human consumption in a controlled and managed way.

The key requirements of the Act are that food must comply with food safety requirements, must be "of the nature, substance and quality demanded", and must be correctly described (labelled).

See also
 Food Administration
 Public analyst

References

Food policy in the United Kingdom
Food safety in the United Kingdom
Health and safety in the United Kingdom
Hospitality industry in the United Kingdom
United Kingdom Acts of Parliament 1990